Port-de-Paix is an arrondissement in the Nord-Ouest department of Haiti. As of 2015, the population was 336,650 inhabitants. Postal codes in the Port-de-Paix Arrondissement start with the number 31.

The arrondissement consists of the following communes:
 Port-de-Paix
 Bassin-Bleu
 Chansolme
 Lapointe
 Île de la Tortue (the island Tortuga)

References

Arrondissements of Haiti
Nord-Ouest (department)